Wittmar is a municipality in the district of Wolfenbüttel, in Lower Saxony, Germany.

Asse
For several hundred years, salt has been mined in Asse, a small mountain range in the district of Wolfenbüttel. One of these mines, Schacht Asse II, is now used to store low- and medium-grade radioactive waste produced by medicine and nuclear power plants.

References

External links
 Samtgemeinde Asse 

Wolfenbüttel (district)
Municipalities in Lower Saxony